Swag is the fourth solo album by former Guns N' Roses guitarist Gilby Clarke, released in 2001. It would be his last studio album until his 2021 album The Gospel Truth.

Track listing

Personnel
Gilby Clarke - guitar, vocals
Johnny Griparic, Stefan Adika - bass
Brian Tichy - drums
Kyle Vincent, Tim Karr - backing vocals
with:
Tracii Guns - lead guitar on "Alien" and "Under the Gun"
Derek Sherinian - synthesizer on "Alien"
Teddy Andreadis - harmonica on "Broken Down Car" and "Warm Country Sun"
David Raven - drums on "Margarita"
Clem Burke - drums on "I'm Nobody" and "Judgement Day"
Eric Singer - drums on "Heart of Chrome" and "Diamond Dogs"
Brent Fitz - drums on "Warm Country Sun"
Michael Lohr - front cover photography

References

Gilby Clarke albums
2002 albums